"Jumpman" is a single by Canadian rapper Drake and American rapper Future from their collaborative mixtape What a Time to Be Alive (2015). The track was sent to rhythmic radio on November 10, 2015, and is symbolic of the Jumpman mascot inspired by a 1984 photograph of Michael Jordan.

Critical reception
Spins Matthew Ramirez wrote, "'Jumpman' is the Young Thug song, complete with a percussive, non-sequitur refrain and Drake attempting to mimic Young Thug’s idiosyncrasies — the result isn’t embarrassing so much as labored, and makes you wish for the real thing." The song hit the top 20 of the Billboard 100, which was a first for Future.

"Jumpman" is notable for its use of a screeching raven sound effect incorporated into the beat.

In the media
Kanye West released a promotional single titled "Facts" on December 31, 2015, in which he uses the same flow that Drake does in "Jumpman". On the March 5, 2016 episode of Saturday Night Live, on which Future was the musical guest, he performed the song during the show's opening monologue, with host Jonah Hill performing Drake's part. In April 2016, "Jumpman" was played during a medley at the 3rd iHeartRadio Music Awards. Also in April, Apple released a commercial for Apple Music featuring Taylor Swift rapping along to the song and accidentally falling face first on the treadmill, which ultimately became popular and was dubbed as "TAYLOR vs TREADMILL". Following the premiere of the commercial, downloads of the song increased by 431%. The song was also used in the opening credits of the 2016 film Central Intelligence.

Commercial performance
Jumpman peaked at number 12 on the US Billboard Hot 100 chart in the week of November 7, 2015, prior to being released as a single. The song was eventually certified quadruple platinum by the Recording Industry Association of America for combined sales and streaming units of over four millions units. As of March 2016, the song has sold 824,000 copies in the United States. In the UK, the song peaked at number 58 on the UK Singles Chart and was certified gold by the British Phonographic Industry (BPI) for sales of over 400,000 copies in the UK.

Charts

Weekly charts

Year-end charts

Certifications

References

2015 songs
Drake (musician) songs
Epic Records singles
Future (rapper) songs
Song recordings produced by Metro Boomin
Songs written by Future (rapper)
Songs written by Drake (musician)
Songs written by Metro Boomin